Afonso III Mvemba a Nimi (also spelt Affonso III) was a ruler of the kingdom of Kongo during its civil war period.

King Afonso III first enters written record as the ruler of the Marquisate of Nkondo. He governed that area from late 1669 until mid-1673. After which, he claimed the throne of divided Kongo. His reign was short and lasted only until the middle of 1674.

See also
Kingdom of Kongo
List of Manikongos of Kongo

References

Manikongo of Kongo
17th-century African people